Ruby Hammer is a MBE Global Makeup Artist and a fashion and beauty entrepreneur. She was awarded an MBE in 2007 for her long-standing contribution to the cosmetics industry.

Early life
Hammer was born to Bangladeshi parents in Jos, Nigeria where her father was a doctor. She emigrated with her family to Britain at the age of 12. Her parents intended to return to Bangladesh (known as East Pakistan at the time), bur the Bangladesh Liberation War broke out there while they were on holiday in England thus altering their plans. In 1984, Hammer graduated with a BA (Hons) in Economics from City University London.

Career
Hammer has worked as a makeup artist on models and celebrities including Sharon Stone, Kate Moss, Rosie Huntington-Whiteley, Naomi Campbell, Cindy Crawford, Helena Christensen, Caroline Winberg, Elle MacPherson, Alessandra Ambrosia, Tyra Banks, Poppy Delevingne, Cat Deeley, Meghan Markle, Rita Wilson and Tom Hanks. She has also styled the cosmetics looks for the covers of Red Magazine, Elle, Tatler, Easy Living, Harper's Baazar, You and Stella, and Sunday Times Style.

Hammer's first foray into makeup artistry was assisting at London Fashion Week. After realizing that she could make a living from her hobby, Hammer went on to do the makeup of runway models for designers including John Galliano and Jasper Conran.

Hammer has worked on advertising campaigns and television commercials for international brands such as Oil of Olay, Pantene and Head & Shoulders. She has been asked to launch products, advise on new looks and train personnel for Estee Lauder, Clarins, Clinique, Aveda and Revlon. 

Hammer's television credits include The Clothes Show, BBC Style Challenge, Britain's Next Top Model, GMTV, This Morning, Beautification and 10 Years Younger, where she was the resident makeup artist for 3 series.

In 1998, Hammer teamed up with beauty publicist Millie Kendall to create the Ruby & Millie cosmetics brand, sold exclusively in Boots pharmacies, nationwide. It was the first major UK cosmetics brand to launch in 30 years. In August 1998, the first Ruby & Millie location was opened in Harvey Nichols in Leeds and London. In December 2009, Ruby & Millie launched teen cosmetics range Scarlett and Crimson.

In September 2011, Hammer launched the cosmetics beauty gifting range "Ruby Hammer Recommends" exclusive to Debenhams.

In August 2019, Hammer launched her capsule collection of beauty essentials which led to the industry nominations of 'Best Newcomer' Vogue Magazine, and Best Expert-Led Beauty Brand. Sunday Times Style.  

In partnership with ex-husband, George Hammer, she has helped introduce beauty brands like Aveda, Tweezerman, Mr Mascara and L’Occitane to the UK.

She has published quotes on trends, beauty tips and advice in the British press.  

She has judged multiple Beauty Awards. 

A board member for the British Beauty Council, Hammer advocates for inclusivity within the beauty industry.

Awards and recognition

 In December 2002, at the launch of the British Asian Fashion Awards held at The Clothes Show, Hammer received a special presentation of the very first award, the "Outstanding Individuals Award," which pays tribute to an individual or group who has made a significant contribution to the British Asian or mainstream fashion industry.
 In 2007, Hammer was appointed Member of the Order of the British Empire (MBE) in the 2007 New Year Honours for her long-standing contribution to the cosmetics industry.

 In November 2013 she was nominated for the #EightWomen Awards.

Personal life
Ruby enjoys spending time at her home in London, which she shares with her husband Martin Kuczmarski. She has a daughter, Reena, who also works in the beauty industry, and one grandchild, Max.

She can speak fluent English, Bengali, Hausa and Hindi.

Books
 Hammer, Ruby; Kendall, Millie. (2000). Face Up: The Essential Make-up Handbook. Ebury Publishing. .

See also
 British Bangladeshi
 Business of British Bangladeshis
 List of British Bangladeshis

References

External links

 
 
 Hammer and Kendall website
 Scarlett and Crimson website

 Fox, Imogen. SHOPPING WITH... RUBY HAMMER: Frocks, flowers and a whole lot of brushes. The Independent. 18 October 1998
 Interview: Ruby Hammer. Female First. 26 May 2009
 Carly. Ruby Hammer Interview. Non Stop Mama. 5 November 2009
 Exclusive Interview with Ruby Hammer. Beauty Sauce. 31 January 2012
 Ruby Hammer Interview. TalkTalk

1961 births
Living people
Nigerian people of Bangladeshi descent
British people of Bangladeshi descent
Nigerian emigrants to the United Kingdom
British make-up artists
British cosmetics businesspeople
British women in business
British columnists
British Asian writers
21st-century British writers
21st-century British women writers
Businesspeople from London
Writers from London
People from Maida Vale
Alumni of City, University of London
Members of the Order of the British Empire
British women columnists